The 2017 Uttarakhand Legislative Assembly election were the 4th Vidhan Sabha (Legislative Assembly) election of the state of Uttarakhand in India. Elections were held on 15 February 2017 in a single phase for the 69 seats of the Uttarakhand Legislative Assembly. Voting in the Karnaprayag constituency was postponed until 9 March 2017 due to the death of BSP candidate Kuldeep Kanwasi in a road accident. In the previous election in 2012, none of the parties won a majority but the Indian National Congress formed the government with the help of PDF in the leadership of Vijay Bahuguna.

The voter turnout for the 69 seats of Uttarakhand Legislative Assembly that held on 15 February was 65.64% which is less than the last election's voter turnout of 66.85%.

Schedule and electorate  

The schedule for the Uttarakhand Assembly Election was announced by the Election Commission of India on 4 January 2017 and elections took place on 15 February 2017. 69 out of 70 ACs went on to polls on the same day but polls were postponed for Karnaprayag Assembly constituency to 9 March. The results were announced on 11 March 2017.  Voter-verified paper audit trail (VVPAT) machines were used along with EVM in four assembly constituencies in Uttarakhand.

Voter statistics

Opinion polls

Results

Result were declared on 11 March 2017.

Results by constituency

List of elected Assembly members

Complete list of winners with the margin of winning votes.

See also 
4th Uttarakhand Assembly
Trivendra Singh Rawat ministry
Tirath Singh Rawat ministry
First Dhami ministry
Elections in Uttarakhand
Politics of Uttarakhand
2017 elections in India

References

External links
 Election 2017 Results

2017
2017 State Assembly elections in India